Stuart White (born 19 July 1970) is a South African cricketer. He played in one first-class match for Boland in 1993/94.

See also
 List of Boland representative cricketers

References

External links
 

1970 births
Living people
South African cricketers
Boland cricketers
Cricketers from Cape Town